Sustainable urban agriculture is an emerging field that involves the practice of growing fruits, vegetables, and other food crops within city limits, using methods that are environmentally friendly and socially responsible. The concept of SUA is rooted in the belief that cities can and should produce a significant portion of their own food to reduce dependence on industrial agriculture and its associated negative environmental impacts, such as pesticide use, water pollution, and fossil fuel consumption.

Methods 
There are several different approaches to SUA, including:

 Community gardens: plots of land that are collectively managed by a group of individuals, often located in underutilized urban spaces such as vacant lots or parks.
 Rooftop gardens and green roofs: cultivation of plants on top of buildings.
 Urban farms: larger-scale agricultural production within city limits, often using innovative technologies such as hydroponics and aquaponics.
 Vertical farms: method of growing crops indoors in stacked layers, using artificial lighting and controlled climate.

Benefits 
Sustainable urban agriculture (SUA) offers several benefits, including:

 Reducing dependence on industrial agriculture and its associated negative environmental impacts
 Improving air quality, providing educational opportunities and promoting community development
 Year-round production, regardless of weather conditions
 Reduced water usage and the need for pesticides.

Criticism 
SUA has received concerns about its feasibility, scalability, and sustainability. Some of the criticisms of SUA include:

Feasibility and salability 
Critics argue that SUA may not be able to meet the food needs of a large urban population, as the amount of land available for farming within cities is limited. Additionally, some critics argue that the costs of implementing and maintaining SUA may be too high for many cities to bear.

Sustainability 
Critics argue that SUA is not truly sustainable, as it requires the use of energy, water, and other resources, which may not be available in sufficient quantities in urban areas. Additionally, some critics argue that the use of pesticides and other chemicals may be necessary to maintain the productivity of urban farms, which could have a negative impact on the environment.

Economic viability 
Critics argue that SUA may not be economically viable, as the costs of setting up and maintaining an urban farm may be high and the yields may not be sufficient to make it a profitable enterprise.

See also 

 Metropolitan agriculture
 Rooftop gardens
 Satoyama
 Sheet mulching
 Smallholding
 Subsistence agriculture
 Terraces (agriculture)
 Underground farming
 Urban horticulture
 Urban forestry
 Vertical farming

References 

Urban agriculture